Nimmo, previously known as Nimmo & the Gauntlets are a British electronic music band from London, consisting of Sarah Nimmo and Reva Gauntlett.

Discography

Studio albums 

 The Power (2019)

Extended plays 

 Room 5 Sessions (2016)
 Songs from the Credits (2018)

Singles 

 "Jaded" (2014)
 "Others" (2014)
 "Dilute This" (2015)
 "UnYoung" (2015)
 "Touch Me" (2016)
 "My Only Friend" (2016)
 "Dancing Makes Us Brave" (2016)
 "Too Late" (2018)
 "Orange Skies" (2018)
 "It's Easier" (2018)
 "No More" (2019)
 "Everything I Wanted" (2019)
 "The Power" (2019)
 "Place to Rent" (2019)
 "Do I Have to Learn It?" (2020)
 "Come Back" (2020)
 "Company" (2022)
 "You Better Mean It" (2022)

Featured singles 

 Wax Wings - "Reclaim Me" (2020)
 TSHA - "OnlyL" (2021)

References

Alternative dance musical groups
English synth-pop groups
Musical groups from London